Rohini is a series of sounding rockets developed by the Indian Space Research Organisation (ISRO) for meteorological and atmospheric study. The ISRO currently uses RH-200, RH-300, RH-300 Mk-II, RH-560 Mk-II and RH-560 Mk-III rockets, which are launched from the Thumba Equatorial Rocket Launching Station  (TERLS) in Thumba and the Satish Dhawan Space Center in Sriharikota.
 Various programs such as Equatorial ElectroJet (EEJ), Leonid Meteor Shower (LMS), Indian Middle Atmosphere Programme (IMAP), Monsoon Experiment (MONEX), Middle Atmosphere Dynamics (MIDAS), and Sooryagrahan-2010 have been conducted using the Rohini sounding rocket series. It has been the forerunners for ISRO's heavier and more complex launch vehicles, with continued usage even today for atmospheric and meteorological

Nomenclature
The rockets in the series are designated with the letters RH (for "Rohini"), followed by a number corresponding to the diameter (in millimetres) of the rocket.

Series
RH-75

RH-100
The RH-100 was a single-stage solid-fuel rocket that was capable of carrying its payload up to an altitude of 55 km or more. When paired with a 650mm long by 40mm wide copper shaft dart used for meteorological research, it was referred to as a Menaka-I rocket.

RH-125
This rocket was launched on October 9, 1971, from Sriharikota. It flew twice between January 1970 and October 1971.
It was used in testing and perfecting various techniques like staging, destruct system, separation devices and clustering. It was also used as a booster to the weather forecasting rockets. As such it was named as Menaka II which worked along with Menaka I.

RH-200
Solid motors power the first and second stages of the RH-200. A polyvinyl chloride (PVC)-based propellant had previously been employed with the RH-200 rocket. In September 2020, a new propellant based on hydroxyl-terminated polybutadiene (HTPB) was successfully used to flow it from the TERLS.

RH-300

The Rh-300 is a single stage sounding rocket, derived from French Belier rocket engine technology. It has a launch altitude of 100 km (62 mi).
It has ability to lift a payload up to 80 kilograms (20 kg of scientific payload) having volume measuring 380*500 mm in diameter. It is capable of reaching very high acceleration (20 G to M6). Numerous payloads can be tested in a single flight.
RH-560
This two stage vehicle is derived from French Stromboli engine technology. The RH-560 Mk-III variant's maiden flight (the flight was successful) was 12 March 2021.It achieved an apogee of 511.73 kms against the pre-flight prediction of 476 kms. The payloads were Electron and Neutral Wind Probe (ENWi), Langmuir Probe (LP), Tri Methyl Aluminium (TMA).

Applications
The RH-200 is used for meteorological studies, the RH-300 Mk-II for Middle atmospheric studies and the RH-560 Mk-II for Upper atmospheric studies and ionospheric studies. The RH-200 was used as the rocket for the first payload launch in India made by students of VIT University in Vellore.

References

Sounding rockets of India
Space programme of India